Elizabeth Margaret Ellis,  (born 17 January 1973) is a retired Australian netball player, a member of the national team from 1992 until 2007 and captain for the last four of those years. She is the most capped international player for Australian netball. Liz Ellis was inducted to the Victorian Honour Roll of Women in 2006.

Early life and education
Ellis was born in Windsor, New South Wales, on 17 January 1973. After attending Holy Family High School and finishing the last two years of secondary education at John Paul II Senior High School (now known as St Andrew's College), Ellis attended the Australian Institute of Sport on a netball scholarship. She also completed a law degree at Macquarie University while she worked her way up the ranks of Australian netball.

Netball career
After attending the AIS in 1991–1992, Ellis made her debut for the Australian Netball Team in July 1993 against Wales. It was the 1995 World Championships in Birmingham where she stamped her mark on the international netball scene with a sterling performance in the grand final against South Africa. She went on to be a mainstay of the Australian Netball Team, participating in the 1995, 1999, 2003 and 2007 World Championships and the 2002 and 2006 Commonwealth Games. She was named Vice-Captain of the team in 2000 and Captain in 2004 and broke the record for the highest number of tests played for Australia in 2005. She was named Australian Netball's Most Valued Player on four occasions – 1996, 1998, 2002 and 2006.

Ellis became the captain of the Sydney Swifts in 2000. She was the captain for their team in 2001, 2004, 2006 and 2007 Commonwealth Bank Trophy premierships. She played her entire domestic career for the Swifts and holds the record for the most games played in the Commonwealth Bank Trophy (173). In October 2005, Ellis suffered a career-threatening knee injury in a match against New Zealand in Auckland. She defied the critics by making a full recovery from a full knee reconstruction and producing some of the best netball of her career in the two years that followed. Ellis announced her retirement from netball on 19 November 2007, two days after leading Australia to a World Championship victory over New Zealand.

Since her retirement, Ellis has been a netball commentator, working initially for Fox Sports and Network Ten during their coverage of the ANZ Championship and Australian Diamonds test matches. She moved to the Nine Network when it picked up the rights to the Suncorp Super Netball league, and became a regular panellist on the network's weekly Sports Sunday program.

In January 2018 Ellis became an Officer of the Order of Australia (AO) for "distinguished service to netball as an elite player and coach, through support and advocacy for young women, as a contributor to the broadcast and print media industries, and to the community". In recognition of her outstanding career, since 2008 the highest individual accolade awarded to an Australian netball athlete has been the annual Liz Ellis Diamond.

In 2019, she was inducted into Hall of Fame at Australian Women's Health Sport Awards.

Personal life
On 31 March 2011, Ellis announced that she was pregnant. On 28 September 2011, she gave birth to her first child, Evelyn Audrey Stocks, at Sydney's Royal Prince Alfred Hospital.

On 21 October 2015, Ellis announced on "The Project" that after several rounds of IVF and three miscarriages, she was pregnant with her second child. Austin Ralph Stocks was born 4 April 2016.

Liz Ellis wrote a book in 2018 on her experiences with her troubles having children, the book is called "If at First You Don't Conceive" throughout it she talks about her troubles having children and how it worked out for her family. The book launched on 24 April 2018.

References

External links
 
 Liz Elliz profile at Netball Australia website
 Liz Ellis collection at the National Museum of Australia

1973 births
Australian Institute of Sport netball players
Commonwealth Games gold medallists for Australia
Commonwealth Games medallists in netball
Commonwealth Games silver medallists for Australia
Living people
Netball players at the 1998 Commonwealth Games
Netball players at the 2002 Commonwealth Games
Netball players at the 2006 Commonwealth Games
Officers of the Order of Australia
Sydney Swifts players
Australia international netball players
Netball players at the 1993 World Games
Netball players from New South Wales
Australian netball commentators
Esso/Mobil Superleague players
Sport Australia Hall of Fame inductees
1995 World Netball Championships players
1999 World Netball Championships players
2003 World Netball Championships players
2007 World Netball Championships players
Medallists at the 1998 Commonwealth Games
Medallists at the 2002 Commonwealth Games